Marguerite MacIntyre is an American actress, writer and producer. She is known for her role as Elizabeth Forbes in The Vampire Diaries (2009-2017) and as Miss Rhode Island in the 1994 Seinfeld episode The Chaperone.

Biography

She has also appeared in Broadway or Off-Broadway productions of Jane Eyre, City of Angels, No Way to Treat a Lady, Annie Warbucks, Weird Romance, and Mata Hari.

She starred on The Vampire Diaries as Sheriff Forbes until season six and Kyle X.Y as Nicole Trager. For The Vampire Diaries spin-off show The Originals, she is credited as a staff writer, story editor and for the final season as writer and supervising producer.

Filmography

Television

Films

References

External links
 
BuddyTV

Living people
20th-century American actresses
21st-century American actresses
Actresses from Detroit
American film actresses
American stage actresses
American television actresses
American television producers
American television writers
University of Southern California alumni
American women television producers
American women television writers
Screenwriters from Michigan
Year of birth missing (living people)